Magalir Mattum may refer to:
Magalir Mattum (1994 film)
Magalir Mattum (2017 film)